Brett Michael Carroll (born October 3, 1982) is a former Major League baseball player. After attending Middle Tennessee State University, he was selected in the 10th round of the 2004 Major League Baseball draft and signed on June 21, 2004. Carroll also competed for Team USA in the World Cup and Pan American Games, receiving a silver medal in 2011. Only player in MLB history to hit his first MLB home run and a triple off HOF pitcher Randy Johnson in the same game.

Career

Florida Marlins
On June 8, 2009, Carroll hit his first career home run against Randy Johnson. According to the Elias Sport Bureau, the only other currently active major league player whose first major league home run was hit off a pitcher with at least 300 wins is reliever Jon Rauch, whose only career home run came against Roger Clemens in 2004. Carroll also became the first player ever to hit both a home run and a triple against Johnson in the same game.

He drove in the game winning run with his first career walk-off hit on September 23 versus the Philadelphia Phillies.

Kansas City Royals
On November 16, 2010, Carroll signed with the Kansas City Royals organization. He was traded to the Milwaukee Brewers organization on March 22, 2011, for cash considerations. On July 21, he had his contract purchased by the Brewers. On July 30, he was designated for assignment. He was outrighted to Triple-A, but opted for free agency on August 3.

Boston Red Sox
He signed a minor league contract with the Boston Red Sox on August 5.

Washington Nationals
Carroll signed a minor league contract with the Washington Nationals in December 2011. He broke camp with the team on its Opening Day roster and went 0-for-2 in five games before he was designated for assignment on April 13, 2012, to make room for Rick Ankiel's return from the disabled list. He spent the remainder of the season with Triple-A Syracuse before electing free agency on Oct. 16, 2012.

Pittsburgh Pirates
Carroll spent the 2013 season with the Pittsburgh Pirates' Triple-A affiliate Indianapolis Indians.

Toronto Blue Jays
On February 18, 2014, the Buffalo Bisons announced that Carroll had signed a minor league contract with the Toronto Blue Jays.

References

External links

1982 births
Living people
Albuquerque Isotopes players
Baseball players at the 2011 Pan American Games
Baseball players from Knoxville, Tennessee
Buffalo Bisons (minor league) players
Carolina Mudcats players
Florida Marlins players
Gulf Coast Marlins players
Greensboro Grasshoppers players
Indianapolis Indians players
Jamestown Jammers players
Jupiter Hammerheads players
Lancaster Barnstormers players
Major League Baseball outfielders
Middle Tennessee Blue Raiders baseball players
Milwaukee Brewers players
Nashville Sounds players
New Orleans Zephyrs players
Pan American Games medalists in baseball
Pan American Games silver medalists for the United States
Pawtucket Red Sox players
Peoria Javelinas players
Syracuse Chiefs players
United States national baseball team players
Washington Nationals players
Medalists at the 2011 Pan American Games
American expatriate baseball players in the Dominican Republic
Azucareros del Este players